Yeldham may refer to:

Places
 Great Yeldham, a village in north Essex, England
 Little Yeldham, a small village in north west Essex, England
 Yeldham railway station, in Great Yeldham, Essex, England

People
 Yeldham (surname)